John Dalderby (or Aldberry or d'Aldreby; died 1320) was a medieval Bishop of Lincoln.

Life

Dalderby was rector of Dalderby in Lincolnshire before holding the prebendary of North Kelsey in the diocese of Lincoln. He was chancellor of Lincoln before 24 April 1291.

Dalderby was elected to the see of Lincoln on 15 January 1300 and consecrated on 12 June 1300 at Canterbury.

Dalderby died on 12 January 1320.

Citations

References
 
 
 

Bishops of Lincoln
1320 deaths
14th-century English Roman Catholic bishops
Year of birth unknown